Norman Warren may refer to:

 Norman J. Warren (born 1942), English film director
 Norman Warren (priest) (born 1934), Anglican priest and author